Bank Albilad is an Islamic Saudi bank established in 2004.

History
The bank was established in 2004. The brothers Mohammed and Abdullah Ibrahim Al Subeaei are significant stakeholders.

In 2009, the bank renewed its entire inventory of ATM machines.

Bank Albilad is a Saudi joint stock company, headquartered in Riyadh. In May 2022 its shareholders approved an increase in capitalization to 10 billion Saudi Riyals through a 1-for-3 issue of shares.

Enjaz Banking Services is the remittance department of Bank Albilad.

In February 2021, Nasser Mohammed Al-Subeaei was appointed chairman of the board of directors and Fahd Abdullah Bindekhayel as Vice Chairman.

Services
Bank Albilad offers sharia compliant products and services. The bank provides retail banking products, business products, investment products through the bank investment arm “Albilad Capital ”, international remittance services through the bank Remittance Arm “Enjaz ”.

Board of Directors
 Nasser bin Mohammed Al-Subeaei. (Chairman of the Board of Directors)
 Adeeb Mohammed Abanumai. (Vice Chairman of the Board)
 Zeyad Othman Alhekail. (member)
 Abdulaziz Mohammed AlOnaizan. (member)
 Khalid Abdul Rahman AlRajhi. (member)
 Haitham Sulaiman AlSuhaimi. (member)
 Nasser Sulaiman Abdullah AlNasser (member)
 Mohammed Abdulrahman Abdulaziz AL Rajhi (member)
 Haitham Mohammad Abdulrhman Alfayez (member)
 Muadh Abdulrahman Hasan Alhusaini (member)

Sharia Committee Members 

 His Eminence Sheikh: Prof. Dr. Abdullah Al-Ammar
 His Eminence Sheikh: Dr. Mohammed Al-Osaimi
 His Eminence Sheikh: Prof. Dr. Yousef Al-Shubaily

Objective and Market focus 
The objective of Bank Albilad is to provide all Islamic Sharia compliant banking services. The bank has, as part of its organizational structure, a Sharia Department to be in charge of the follow-up and monitoring of the implementation of the Sharia decisions issued by the Sharia Committee.

See also 

 List of banks in Saudi Arabia

References

Banks established in 2004
Banks of Saudi Arabia
Companies listed on Tadawul
Companies based in Riyadh
Islamic banks of Saudi Arabia
Saudi Arabian companies established in 2004